Giorgio Maggi (born 18 December 1997) is a Swiss professional racing driver. He competes in the NASCAR Whelen Euro Series' EuroNASCAR PRO division, driving the No. 18 Toyota Camry for Race Art Technology. He has also raced in the NASCAR Xfinity Series.

Career
Maggi ran the 2019 season in the Whelen Euro Elite 2 series, finishing 2nd in the standings with 3 wins. Maggi spent the 2020 season in the NASCAR Whelen Euro Series, finishing 11th in the standings with 1 podium. Maggi attempted to qualify for his first NASCAR Xfinity Series race, the 2021 Pennzoil 150, but failed to qualify.

In the 2022 season, Maggi switched teams to Race Art Technology to drive the team's No. 18 Toyota Camry in the EuroNASCAR PRO division.

Racing record

Career summary

NASCAR
(key) (Bold – Pole position awarded by qualifying time. Italics – Pole position earned by points standings or practice time. * – Most laps led.)

Xfinity Series

Whelen Euro Series – EuroNASCAR PRO
(key) (Bold – Pole position. Italics – Fastest lap. * – Most laps led. ^ – Most positions gained)

 Season still in progress.

Whelen Euro Series – Elite 2
(key) (Bold – Pole position. Italics – Fastest lap. * – Most laps led. ^ – Most positions gained)

 Season still in progress
 Ineligible for series points

References

External links
 

Living people
1997 births
NASCAR drivers
Swiss racing drivers
Hergiswil
Sportspeople from Nidwalden
ADAC Formel Masters drivers
ADAC Formula 4 drivers
Asian Le Mans Series drivers
European Le Mans Series drivers
Blancpain Endurance Series drivers
ADAC GT Masters drivers
Mücke Motorsport drivers